The orangebelly darter (Etheostoma radiosum) is a species of freshwater ray-finned fish, a darter from the subfamily Etheostomatinae, part of the family Percidae, which also contains the perches, ruffes and pikeperches. It is endemic to the eastern United States, where it occurs in the Ouachita and Red River drainages in southwestern Arkansas and southeastern Oklahoma. It occurs in gravel and rubble riffles and runs of creeks and small to medium rivers.

References

Etheostoma
Fish described in 1941
Taxa named by Carl Leavitt Hubbs
Taxa named by John D. Black (ichthyologist)